Guri Hetland, née Knotten (born 20 July 1974) is a retired Norwegian cross-country skier.

She competed at the 1994 Junior World Championships without making a mark. She made her World Cup debut in February 1995 in Oslo, placing lowly. She broke the top 30-barrier with a 24th place in December 1997 in Val di Fiemme. In December 1998 she experienced her best run, first breaking the top-20 barrier with a 19th place in Milan, then recording a 17th place three days later, and between 27–29 December two 10th places and an eighth place. Her career best was a December 1999 Engelberg sprint seventh place, and her last World Cup start came at the 2001 Holmenkollen ski festival.

She represented the sports club IL Varden. She is married to Tor Arne Hetland. They worked together as coaches for the Swiss national team.

Cross-country skiing results
All results are sourced from the International Ski Federation (FIS).

World Cup

Season standings

References

External links

1977 births
Living people
Norwegian female cross-country skiers
Norwegian cross-country skiing coaches